This is a list of copper mines in Canada sorted by province.

British Columbia

Newfoundland and Labrador

Ontario

References

 
 Copper